Rastoka may refer to the following places:

 Rastoka, Bosnia and Herzegovina
 , Croatia
 Rastoka, Montenegro

See also 
 Ráztoka in Slovakia